Silvia La Notte (born 15 August 1982) is an Italian kickboxer and Nak Muay, who has been professionally competing since 2002. She is the reigning WAKO World K1 Super Flyweight champion.

She is the former ISKA World Muay Thai Atomweight champion and the former WKN European Champion, as well as the 2008 and 2009 J GIRLS World Queen Tournament winner. She is the FIS Savate 2003 and 2009 World Champion and the 2008 European Champion.

At an amateur level, she is the 2009 WAKO Bantamweight gold medalist. and the European Union Amateur Boxing Championships 2007 Bronze medalist at 48 kg.

Martial arts career
Silvia La Notte made her martial arts debut in 2002. During the first part of her career she fought mainly in Europe, and notably won the European and World Savate championships.

In 2008 she participated in the 2008 J GIRLS World Queen Tournament. In the semi finals, she defeated Shoko Ayashida. In the finals she won a split decision over Graycer Aki.

In March 2009 she fought Linda Ooms for the WAKO World K1 Super Flyweight title.  La Notte won a unanimous decision.

La Notte entered the 2009 edition of the J GIRLS World Queen Tournament. She won decisions over Graycer Aki in the quarter finals, Ho Seongbok in the semi finals and Motoe Abe in the finals, to once again win the tournament.

She faced Maribel De Souza for the WKN European title. La Notte won a unanimous decision.

In her next fight, La Notte faced Ozge San, for her first WAKO title defense. La Notte won the fight by knockout.

After going 9-4 in her next thirteen fights, La Notte faced Ruqsana Begum for the ISKA World Muay Thai Atomweight Championship. La Notte won the fight by TKO.

La Notte went 12-3-1 in her next 17 fights, with a single no contest due to an accidental headbutt. She then faced Monika Chochlíková for her second WAKO title defense. La Notte won a unanimous decision.

Her third title defense came in 2018, against Ludivine Lasnier. La Notte won a unanimous decision.

In 2019 La Notte fought a rematch with Amy Pirnie for the Enfusion 50 kg title. Pirnie won a unanimous decision.

La Notte faced Luisa Burgos at MASL on October 16, 2021, in her first fight in two years. She won the fight by unanimous decision.

Championships and accomplishments

Kickboxing and Muaythai
World Association of Kickboxing Organizations
WAKO World K1 Amateur Atomweight Championship
WAKO World K1 Mini Flyweight championship
Three successful title defenses
International Sport Karate Association
ISKA World Muay Thai Atomweight Championship
J NETWORK
2008 J GIRLS World Queen Tournament Winner
2009 J GIRLS World Queen Tournament Winner
World Kickboxing Network
WKN European Championship
Federation Internationale de Savate
2003 FIS Savate World Flyweight Championship
2008 FIS Savate European Flyweight Championship
2009 FIS Savate World Flyweight Championship

Boxing
European Union Amateur Boxing Championships
2007 Amateur Boxing Championship 48 kg Bronze Medalist

Kickboxing record

|-  bgcolor=
|-  bgcolor="#FFBBBB"
| 13 Nov 2021 || Loss||align=left| Tessa Kakkonen || Total Fight Night V || Lahti, Finland || Decision (Unanimous) || 5 || 3:00  
|-
! style=background:white colspan=9 |
|-
|-  bgcolor="#CCFFCC"
| 16 Oct 2021 || Win||align=left| Luisa Burgos || MASL || Madrid, Spain || Decision (Unanimous) || 3 || 3:00
|-
|-  bgcolor="#FFBBBB"
| 12 Oct 2019|| Loss||align=left| Jade Jorand || Bellator 230 || Milan, Italy || KO (High Kick) || 2 ||  
|-
|-  bgcolor="#CCFFCC"
| 15 Jun 2019|| Win||align=left| Myriame Djedidi || La Nuit de l’Impact V || Saintes, France || Decision (Unanimous) || 3 || 3:00 
|-
|-  bgcolor="#CCFFCC"
| 18 May 2019|| Win||align=left| Cristina Morales || Master Fight || Chalon-sur-Saône, France || Decision (Unanimous) || 3 || 3:00 
|-
|-  bgcolor="#FFBBBB"
| 23 Mar 2019|| Loss||align=left| Amy Pirnie || Enfusion 80 || Roma, Italy || Decision (Unanimous) || 5 || 3:00 
|-
! style=background:white colspan=9 |
|-
|-  bgcolor="#CCFFCC"
| 1 Dec 2018|| Win||align=left| Ludivine Lasnier || Night Of Si’Fight 1 || Troyes, France || Decision (Unanimous) || 5 || 3:00
|-
! style=background:white colspan=9 |
|-
|-  bgcolor="#CCFFCC"
| 3 Nov 2018|| Win||align=left| Delizia Hurtado || Nitro || Marina di Carrara, Italy || Decision (Unanimous) || 3 || 3:00 
|-
|-  bgcolor="#FFBBBB"
| 15 Apr 2018|| Loss||align=left| Guan Acui || Kunlun Fight 72 || Beijing, China || Decision (Unanimous) || 3 || 3:00 
|-
|-  bgcolor="#CCFFCC"
| 15 Dec 2017|| Win||align=left| Żaneta Cieśla || Ladies Fight Night 7: Double Trouble 1 || Łódź, Poland || Decision (Unanimous) || 3 || 3:00 
|-
|-  bgcolor="#CCFFCC"
| 4 Nov 2017|| Win||align=left| Ilenia Perugini || Spirit Boxing Show 2 || Nogent-sur-Seine, France || Decision (Unanimous) || 3 || 3:00 
|-
|-  bgcolor="#CCFFCC"
| 14 Aug 2017|| Win||align=left| Aungkor Phettonpueng || Chiang Mai Stadium || Wat Ket, Thailand || Decision (Unanimous) || 3 || 3:00
|-
|-  bgcolor="#CCFFCC"
| 28 Jul 2017|| Win||align=left| Payayang Tor. Theerasawad || Thaphae Boxing Stadium || Chiang Mai, Thailand || Decision (Unanimous) || 3 || 3:00
|-
|-  bgcolor="#CCFFCC"
| 13 May 2017|| Win||align=left| Monika Chochlíková || Muaythai Evening 8 || Trencin, Slovakia || Decision (Unanimous) || 3 || 3:00 
|-
! style=background:white colspan=9 |
|-
|-  bgcolor="#CCFFCC"
| 25 Mar 2017|| Win||align=left| Ludivine Lasnier || Meaux Fight VI || Meaux, France || Decision (Unanimous) || 3 || 3:00 
|-
|-  bgcolor="#CCFFCC"
| 28 Jan 2017|| Win||align=left| Yolande Alonso || Burning Series || Gaillard, France || Decision (Unanimous) || 3 || 3:00 
|-
|-  bgcolor="#CCFFCC"
| 19 Nov 2016|| Win||align=left| Fanny Ramos || Radikal Fight Night Gold || Charleville-Mézières, France || Decision (Unanimous) || 3 || 3:00 
|-
|-  bgcolor="#CCFFCC"
| 29 Oct 2016|| Win||align=left| Lou-Anne Pimentel || Spirit Boxing Show || Nogent-sur-Seine, France || Decision (Unanimous) || 3 || 3:00
|-
|-  bgcolor="#CCFFCC"
| 22 May 2016|| Win||align=left| Daniela Sprecher || Victory || Milan, Italy || Decision (Unanimous) || 3 || 3:00 
|-
|-  bgcolor="#c5d2ea"
| 23 Jan 2016|| Draw||align=left| Yolande Alonso || Burning Muay Thai Series 5 || Arbent, France || Decision (Unanimous) || 3 || 3:00
|-
|-  bgcolor="#FFBBBB"
| 28 Nov 2015|| Loss||align=left| Stella Bartoletti || Gladiator || Bologna, Italy || Decision (Unanimous) || 3 || 3:00
|-
|-  bgcolor="#CCFFCC"
| 19 Sep 2015|| Win||align=left| Fanny Ramos || Swiss Fight Night || Lugano, Switzerland || Decision (Unanimous) || 3 || 3:00 
|-
|-  bgcolor="#CCFFCC"
| 23 May 2015|| Win||align=left| Mara Sadocco || Total Fight || Milan, Italy || Decision (Unanimous) || 3 || 3:00 
|-
|-  bgcolor="#CCFFCC"
| 25 Apr 2015|| Win||align=left| Barbara Bontempi || Ring Mania 3 || Lodi, Italy || Decision (Unanimous) || 3 || 3:00
|-
|-  bgcolor="#CCFFCC"
| 28 Feb 2015|| Win||align=left| Ariana Santos || Ring War || Milan, Italy || Decision (Unanimous) || 3 || 3:00
|-
|-  bgcolor="#FFBBBB"
| 28 Jun 2014|| Loss||align=left| Jleana Valentino || 360° Fight Night || Taranto, Italy || Decision (Unanimous) || 3 || 3:00
|-
|-  bgcolor="#CCFFCC"
| 22 Mar 2014|| Win||align=left| Barbara Bontempi || The Fighters Pro || Milan, Italy || TKO || 3 || 3:00
|-
|-  bgcolor="#CCFFCC"
| 23 Feb 2014|| Win||align=left| Ilaria Stivanello || Fast And Furious || Milan, Italy || Decision (Unanimous) || 3 || 3:00
|-
|-  bgcolor="#CCFFCC"
| 30 Nov 2013|| Win||align=left| Francesca Cigolini || The Night Of Kick And Punch || Milan, Italy || Decision (Unanimous) || 3 || 3:00
|-
|-  bgcolor="#FFBBBB"
| 15 Nov 2013|| Loss||align=left| Lommanee Sor Hirun || Yokkao 5 || Pattaya, Thailand || Decision (Unanimous) || 3 || 3:00
|-
|-  bgcolor="#CCFFCC"
| 18 May 2013|| Win||align=left| Heli Salapuro || Night of Kick and Punch III°edizione || Milan, Italy || Decision (Unanimous) || 3 || 3:00
|-
|-  bgcolor="#CCFFCC"
| 13 Apr 2013|| Win||align=left| Ruqsana Begum || Last Man Standing || Birmingham, England || TKO || 3 || 3:00
|-
! style=background:white colspan=9 |
|-
|-  bgcolor="#CCFFCC"
| 26 Jan 2013|| Win||align=left| Denise Castle || Yokkao Extreme || Milan, Italy || Decision (Unanimous) || 3 || 3:00
|-
|-  bgcolor="#FFBBBB"
| 10 Nov 2012|| Loss||align=left| Johanna Rydberg || Night of Kick and Punch II°edizione || Riccione, Italy || Decision (Unanimous) || 3 || 3:00
|-
|-  bgcolor="#FFBBBB"
| 14 Jul 2012|| Loss||align=left| Susan Kariuki || Gala Kick & Punch || Milan, Italy || Decision (Unanimous) || 3 || 3:00
|-
|-  bgcolor="#CCFFCC"
| 19 May 2012|| Win||align=left| Elke Beinwachs || Gala Kick & Punch || Milan, Italy || TKO || 3 || 3:00
|-
|-  bgcolor="#CCFFCC"
| 21 Jan 2012|| Win||align=left| Ariana Santos || Yokkao Extreme || Milan, Italy || Decision (Unanimous) || 3 || 3:00
|-
|-  bgcolor="#CCFFCC"
| 8 Oct 2011|| Win||align=left| Sarai Medina || Muaythai The Art Of Fighting || Tarragona, Spain || Decision (Unanimous) || 3 || 3:00
|-
|-  bgcolor="#FFBBBB"
| 4 Jun 2011|| Loss||align=left| Erika Kamimura || RISE 78 || Tokyo, Japan || TKO || 3 || 3:00
|-
|-  bgcolor="#CCFFCC"
| 30 Apr 2011|| Win||align=left| Sarai Medina || Ring Rules || Milan, Italy || Decision (Unanimous) || 3 || 3:00
|-
|-  bgcolor="#CCFFCC"
| 12 Feb 2011|| Win||align=left| GEARAP || Desio || Milan, Italy || Decision (Unanimous) || 3 || 3:00
|-
|-  bgcolor="#CCFFCC"
| 6 Feb 2011|| Win||align=left| Amy Pirnie || Night Kick Out V || Lucca, Italy || DQ || 3 || 3:00
|-
|-  bgcolor="#CCFFCC"
| 7 Nov 2010|| Win||align=left| Gabriella Rutigliano || Gladiatori || Bologna, Italy || Decision (Unanimous) || 3 || 3:00
|-
|-  bgcolor="#CCFFCC"
| 10 Jul 2010|| Win||align=left| Emy Kougioumtzoglou || Otranto || Lecce, Italy || Decision (Unanimous) || 3 || 3:00
|-
|-  bgcolor="#FFBBBB"
| 11 Apr 2010|| Loss||align=left| Zeljana Pitesa || Fight Day 10 || Santeramo, Italy || Decision (Unanimous) || 3 || 3:00
|-
|-  bgcolor="#CCFFCC"
| 20 Mar 2010|| Win||align=left| Ozge San || Kickboxing Superstar || Milan, Italy || KO || 3 || 3:00
|-
! style=background:white colspan=9 |
|-
|-  bgcolor="#CCFFCC"
| 14 Feb 2010|| Win||align=left| Maribel De Souza || The Woman Warrior || Barcelona, Spain || Decision (Unanimous) || 3 || 3:00
|-
! style=background:white colspan=9 |
|-
|-  bgcolor="#CCFFCC"
| 20 Dec 2009|| Win||align=left| Motoe Abe || J-Girls Final Stage 2009 || Tokyo, Japan || Decision (Unanimous) || 3 || 3:00
|-
! style=background:white colspan=9 |
|-
|-  bgcolor="#CCFFCC"
| 20 Dec 2009|| Win||align=left| Ho Seongbok || J-Girls Final Stage 2009 || Tokyo, Japan || Decision (Unanimous) || 3 || 3:00
|-
! style=background:white colspan=9 |
|-
|-  bgcolor="#CCFFCC"
| 20 Dec 2009|| Win||align=left| Graycer Aki || J-Girls Final Stage 2009 || Tokyo, Japan || Decision (Unanimous) || 3 || 3:00
|-
! style=background:white colspan=9 |
|-
|-  bgcolor="#CCFFCC"
| 20 Nov 2009|| Win||align=left| Gabriella Rutigliano || Ring Rules || Milan, Italy || Decision (Unanimous) || 3 || 3:00 
|-
|-  bgcolor="#CCFFCC"
| 11 Jul 2009|| Win||align=left| Silvia Valicelli || Best Of The Best 7 || Jesolo, Italy || Decision (Unanimous) || 3 || 3:00
|-
|-  bgcolor="#CCFFCC"
| 14 Mar 2009|| Win||align=left| Linda Ooms || OKTAGON || Milan, Italy || Decision (Unanimous) || 3 || 3:00
|-
! style=background:white colspan=9 |
|-
|-  bgcolor="#CCFFCC"
| 25 Jan 2009|| Win||align=left| Marilena Andronico || Night Fight Girl || Rome, Italy || Decision (Unanimous) || 3 || 3:00
|-
|-  bgcolor="#CCFFCC"
| 30 Nov 2008|| Win||align=left| Silvia Morelli || Rimini || Rimini, Italy || Decision (Unanimous) || 3 || 3:00
|-
|-  bgcolor="#CCFFCC"
| 25 May 2008|| Win||align=left| Graycer Aki || J-Girls World Queen Tournament 2008 || Tokyo, Japan || Decision (Split) || 4 || 3:00
|-
! style=background:white colspan=9 |
|-
|-  bgcolor="#CCFFCC"
| 25 May 2008|| Win||align=left| Shoko Ayashida || J-Girls World Queen Tournament 2008 || Tokyo, Japan || Decision (Unanimous) || 3 || 3:00
|-
! style=background:white colspan=9 |
|-
|-  bgcolor="#CCFFCC"
| 20 Apr 2008|| Win||align=left| Stella Morelli || Gladiators Tournament III || Osimo, Italy || Decision (Unanimous) || 3 || 3:00
|-
|-  bgcolor="#CCFFCC"
| 17 Feb 2008|| Win||align=left| Maria Tzortzi || Gladiators Tournament || Osimo, Italy || Decision (Unanimous) || 3 || 3:00
|-
|-  bgcolor="#FFBBBB"
| 22 Apr 2007|| Loss||align=left| Perla Bragagnolo || Gala Internazionale Di Thai Boxe || Ivrea, Italy || Decision (Unanimous) || 3 || 3:00
|-
|-  bgcolor="#c5d2ea"
| 22 Apr 2007|| Draw||align=left| Maria Zorzi || Jesolo Fight Night || Jesolo, Italy || Decision (Unanimous) || 3 || 3:00
|-
|-  bgcolor="#CCFFCC"
| 12 Nov 2006|| Win||align=left| Petra Buchberger || ? || Milano, Milano || Decision (Unanimous) || 3 || 3:00
|-
|-  bgcolor="#CCFFCC"
| 16 Apr 2006|| Win||align=left| Maria Tzortzi || ? || Bellaria, Milano || Decision (Unanimous) || 3 || 3:00
|-
|-  bgcolor="#CCFFCC"
| 16 Apr 2006|| Win||align=left| Amal Elabdaoui || ? || Bellaria, Milano || Decision (Unanimous) || 3 || 3:00
|-
|-  bgcolor="#c5d2ea"
| 12 Feb 2006|| Draw||align=left| Silvia Valicelli || ? || Rimini, Milano || Decision (Unanimous) || 3 || 3:00
|-
|-  bgcolor="#CCFFCC"
| 23 Jul 2005|| Win||align=left| Perla Bragagnolo || ? || Milano, Milano || Decision (Unanimous) || 3 || 3:00
|-
|-  bgcolor="#FFBBBB"
| 27 Feb 2005|| Loss||align=left| Silvia Valicelli || ? || Rimini, Milano || Decision (Unanimous) || 3 || 3:00
|-
|-  bgcolor="#FFBBBB"
| 20 Nov 2004|| Loss||align=left| Kaina Arioche || ? || Paris, France || Decision (Unanimous) || 3 || 3:00
|-
|-  bgcolor="#CCFFCC"
| 10 Apr 2004|| Win||align=left| Silvia Valicelli || ? || Milan, Italy || Decision (Unanimous) || 3 || 3:00
|-
|-
| colspan=9 | Legend:

See also
 List of female kickboxers

References

External links
 Silvia La Notte at Awakening Fighters
 Silvia La Notte at Muay Thai TV

1982 births
Italian female kickboxers
Living people
Sportspeople from Milan
Italian Muay Thai practitioners
Female Muay Thai practitioners
Flyweight kickboxers